A walk-in clinic (also known as a walk-in centre) is a medical facility that accepts patients on a walk-in basis and with no appointment required. A number of healthcare service providers fall under the walk-in clinic umbrella including urgent care centers, retail clinics and even many free clinics or community health clinics. Walk-in clinics offer the advantages of being accessible and often inexpensive. 
It is estimated that there are nearly 11,000 walk-in clinics in America, although it is impossible to calculate an exact number given the variable and ill-defined nature of the category. Urgent care centers make up the largest percentage of walk-in clinics in America with an estimated 9,000 locations nationwide. In fact, consumers often erroneously refer to all walk-in clinics as urgent care centers, and vice versa. Retail clinics are the next most prevalent in the industry with 1,443 locations as of July 1, 2013.

Walk-in clinics have been criticized for providing poor quality healthcare as opposed to professional care such as regular doctors and hospitals. Other disadvantages may include the urgency to make the patient's visit as quick as possible in order to reduce the long waiting list of walk-ins at the clinic, which may fail to fulfill the purpose of the visit.

Services
Urgent care clinics are usually led by physicians. The much smaller category of retail clinics, which are stand-alone clinics located inside large retail stores or shopping malls, tend to be headed by nurse practitioners. The significantly higher price for an urgent care visit compared to a retail clinic visit is largely attributed to this difference in staffing.

All types of walk-in clinics provide basic medical services, such as routine vaccinations, evaluation of cold and flu symptoms, and treatment for less severe physical injuries. Urgent care centers normally provide more services, such as X-ray testing for suspected pneumonia or broken bones.

Access to the patient's regular medical records depends on the agreements that the clinic has with other organizations. For example, a walk-in clinic that is part of or affiliated with a hospital or larger clinic may have full access to all the medical records belonging to the larger institution, while an independent walk-in clinic may not have to access any patient records except those related to previous visits to that walk-in clinic. This lack of access can prevent healthcare providers from recognizing chronic problems.

Major companies in the United States

The 100 largest urgent care operators in the United States run approximately 25% of the locations under their banners

Opposition
The existence of walk-in clinics has met some opposition. Doctors acknowledge that retail-based clinics are convenient. Primary care doctors say they are trying to build a relationship with their patients, meet them regularly, and follow up on problems. These clinics interfere with that relationship and can potentially fragment health care. There is also the concern that the urgent care clinics fail to provide the primary care providers documents about the visit for the minor emergency. This can further fragment a patient's care. Claire McCarthy, pediatrician, addressed the lack of shared medical records, "Sometimes a minor thing isn't so minor." The American Academy of Pediatrics has recommended that parents do not use retail-based clinics for primary care for their children.

References

Clinics
Emergency medicine organisations
General practice